Marcelo Trujillo Panisse (April 30, 1935 – September 15, 2019) was a Puerto Rican politician, who was elected to four terms as mayor of Humacao, Puerto Rico. Trujillo was affiliated with the Popular Democratic Party (PPD) and served as mayor from 2001 to 2019. He earned a bachelor's degree in political and social sciences from the Pontifical Catholic University of Puerto Rico.

Basketball
Trujillo had a career in basketball when he played for the Leones de Ponce of Baloncesto Superior Nacional. Later, Trujillo Panisse retired as a player, but continued at the BSN as a coach. In that capacity, he led the Piratas de Quebradillas and the Capitanes de Arecibo.

Mayor
After serving as a Member of the Municipal Assembly of Humacao fron 1996 to 2000, Trujillo ran for mayor of Humacao, Puerto Rico at the 2000 elections. Served for nineteen years; from 2000 until his death in 2019.

Death
He died on September 15, 2019, at the  age of 84 due to cardiac arrest. He was buried at the Pax Christi Cemetery in Humacao, Puerto Rico.

References

1935 births
2019 deaths
Baloncesto Superior Nacional players
BSN coaches
Mayors of places in Puerto Rico
Pontifical Catholic University of Puerto Rico alumni
Popular Democratic Party (Puerto Rico) politicians
People from Guayanilla, Puerto Rico
People from Humacao, Puerto Rico
Puerto Rican Army personnel
United States Army soldiers